As a member of FIFA and UEFA, the Montenegro national football team has been playing official matches since March 2007. Montenegro plays in the qualifiers for the FIFA World Cup and UEFA European Championship, as well as partaking in the UEFA Nations League. Apart from that, the team participates in friendly matches.

Individual records

Most capped players

Top goalscorers

List of players
The following table summarizes caps for the Montenegro national team by every single player, since 2007. 
{| class="wikitable sortable" style="text-align: center;"
|-
!Player
!Montenegro career
!Caps
!
!
!
!
|-
|style="text-align:left;"|Fatos Bećiraj||||75||11||49||26||10
|-
|style="text-align:left;"|Elsad Zverotić||2008–2017||61||0||38||23||5
|-
|style="text-align:left;"|Stevan Jovetić||2007–2020||56||27||41||15||27
|-
|style="text-align:left;"|Stefan Savić||2010–2020||55||8||40||15||5
|-
|style="text-align:left;"|Mirko Vučinić||2007–2017||46||38||27||19||17
|-
|style="text-align:left;"|Simon Vukčević||2007–2014||45||1||26||19||2
|-
|style="text-align:left;"|Nikola Vukčević||2014–2020||44||4||33||11||1
|-
|style="text-align:left;"|Marko Simić||2013–2020||44||2||28||16||1
|-
|style="text-align:left;"|Vladimir Božović||2007–2014||43||0||21||22||0
|-
|style="text-align:left;"|Mladen Božović||2007–2017||41||0||23||18||0
|-
|style="text-align:left;"|Marko Baša||2009–2017||39||0||25||14||2
|-
|style="text-align:left;"|Savo Pavićević||2007–2014||39||0||19||20||0
|-
|style="text-align:left;"|Vukašin Poleksić||2007–2016||38||4||20||18||0
|-
|style="text-align:left;"|Žarko Tomašević||2010–2019||37||0||23||14||4
|-
|style="text-align:left;"|Milan Jovanović||2007–2014||36||1||16||20||0
|-
|style="text-align:left;"|Stefan Mugoša||2015–2019||35||0||22||13||10
|-
|style="text-align:left;"|Adam Marušić||2015–2020||35||0||27||8||0
|-
|style="text-align:left;"|Milorad Peković||2007–2013||34||0||19||15||0
|-
|style="text-align:left;"|Nikola Drinčić||2007–2014||33||1||20||13||3
|-
|style="text-align:left;"|Vladimir Jovović||2013–2020||33||0||23||10||0
|-
|style="text-align:left;"|Branko Bošković||2007–2014||30||9||15||15||1
|-
|style="text-align:left;"|Dejan Damjanović||2008–2015||30||0||26||4||8
|-
|style="text-align:left;"|Marko Vešović||2013–2019||30||0||19||11||2
|-
|style="text-align:left;"|Aleksandar Boljević||2013–2020||29||0||19||10||0
|-
|style="text-align:left;"|Radomir Đalović||2007–2011||26||1||11||15||7
|-
|style="text-align:left;"|Miodrag Džudović||2008–2013||26||0||15||11||1
|-
|style="text-align:left;"|Radoslav Batak||2007–2011||25||0||11||14||1
|-
|style="text-align:left;"|Mitar Novaković||2007–2013||25||0||12||13||0
|-
|style="text-align:left;"|Mladen Kašćelan||2009–2016||25||0||13||12||0
|-
|style="text-align:left;"|Luka Pejović||2007–2012||23||0||7||16||1
|-
|style="text-align:left;"|Marko Janković||2016–2020||23||0||17||6||2
|-
|style="text-align:left;"|Danijel Petković||2014–2020||23||1||16||7||0
|-
|style="text-align:left;"|Nebojša Kosović||2016–2020||22||0||16||6||1
|-
|style="text-align:left;"|Andrija Delibašić||2009–2013||21||0||12||9||6
|-
|style="text-align:left;"|Aleksandar Šćekić||2016–2020||20||0||16||4||0
|-
|style="text-align:left;"|Marko Bakić||2012–2020||18||0||10||8||0
|-
|style="text-align:left;"|Vladimir Volkov||2012–2015||17||0||13||4||0
|-
|style="text-align:left;"|Filip Stojković||2016–2019||15||0||10||5||0
|-
|style="text-align:left;"|Mirko Ivanić||2017–2019||15||0||13||2||1
|-
|style="text-align:left;"|Saša Balić||2011–2020||13||0||6||7||0
|-
|style="text-align:left;"|Milan Mijatović||2015–2020||13||0||9||4||0
|-
|style="text-align:left;"|Jovan Tanasijević||2007–2009||13||0||5||8||0
|-
|style="text-align:left;"|Sead Hakšabanović||2017–2020||12||0||8||4||1
|-
|style="text-align:left;"|Luka Đorđević||2012–2018||11||0||6||5||1
|-
|style="text-align:left;"|Filip Kasalica||2012–2014||11||0||8||3||1
|-
|style="text-align:left;"|Nemanja Nikolić||2009–2016||10||0||4||6||0
|-
|style="text-align:left;"|Boris Kopitović||2018–2019||8||0||5||3||1
|-
|style="text-align:left;"|Damir Kojašević||2016–2019||9||0||6||3||1
|-
|style="text-align:left;"|Branislav Janković||2014–2020||9||0||3||6||0
|-
|style="text-align:left;"|Igor Burzanović||2007–2008||8||2||1||7||2|-
|style="text-align:left;"|Momčilo Raspopović||2019–2020||7||0||5||2||0
|-
|style="text-align:left;"|Emrah Klimenta||2016–2018||7||0||3||4||0
|-
|style="text-align:left;"|Petar Grbić||2011–2016||7||0||2||5||0
|-
|style="text-align:left;"|Risto Lakić||2007–2008||7||0||0||7||0
|-
|style="text-align:left;"|Dragan Bogavac||2007–2008||7||0||1||6||0
|-
|style="text-align:left;"|Risto Radunović||2018–2020||7||0||6||1||0
|-
|style="text-align:left;"|Aleksandar Šofranac||2016–2020||7||0||3||4||0
|-
|style="text-align:left;"|Vlado Jeknić||2007||6||0||0||6||0
|-
|style="text-align:left;"|Nikola Vujović||2007–2009||6||0||2||4||0
|-
|style="text-align:left;"|Milan Purović||2007–2008||6||0||0||6||0
|-
|style="text-align:left;"|Ivan Fatić||2009–2011||6||0||4||2||0
|-
|style="text-align:left;"|Deni Hočko||2018–2020||6||0||2||4||0
|-
|style="text-align:left;"|Marko Ćetković||2010–2013||6||0||1||5||1
|-
|style="text-align:left;"|Nemanja Mijušković||2017–2018||6||0||4||2||0
|-
|style="text-align:left;"|Dušan Lagator||2019||6||0||4||2||0
|-
|style="text-align:left;"|Igor Vujačić||2019–2020||6||0||5||1||0
|-
|style="text-align:left;"|Vladimir Rodić||2015–2016||5||0||2||3||0
|-
|style="text-align:left;"|Dejan Ognjanović||2008–2010||5||0||0||5||0
|-
|style="text-align:left;"|Miloš Krkotić||2013||5||0||3||2||0
|-
|style="text-align:left;"|Dino Islamović||2020||5||0||4||1||0
|-
|style="text-align:left;"|Ivan Kecojević||2012–2013||5||0||4||1||0
|-
|style="text-align:left;"|Darko Zorić||2014–2018||4||0||1||3||1
|-
|style="text-align:left;"|Esteban Saveljich||2015–2016||4||0||2||2||0
|-
|style="text-align:left;"|Staniša Mandić||2015||4||0||3||1||0
|-
|style="text-align:left;"|Vukan Savićević||2017–2019||4||0||2||2||0
|-
|style="text-align:left;"|Janko Tumbasević||2007||4||0||0||4||0
|-
|style="text-align:left;"|Luka Mirković||2018–2020||4||0||1||3||0
|-
|style="text-align:left;"|Igor Ivanović||2020||3||0||2||1||3
|-
|style="text-align:left;"|Darko Bulatović||2019–2020||3||0||1||2||0
|-
|style="text-align:left;"|Mirko Raičević||2007||3||0||0||3||0
|-
|style="text-align:left;"|Filip Raičević||2016||3||0||1||2||0
|-
|style="text-align:left;"|Srđan Radonjić||2007||3||0||0||3||0
|-
|style="text-align:left;"|Marko Vukčević||2015–2020||3||0||1||2||0
|-
|style="text-align:left;"|Đorđije Ćetković||2007–2008||3||0||0||3||0
|-
|style="text-align:left;"|Darko Nikač||2013–2014||3||0||0||3||0
|-
|style="text-align:left;"|Miroje Jovanović||2013–2014||3||0||0||3||1
|-
|style="text-align:left;"|Draško Božović||2010||3||0||1||2||0
|-
|style="text-align:left;"|Vladimir Vujović||2007||3||0||0||3||0
|-
|style="text-align:left;"|Miloš Raičković||2020||3||0||1||2||0
|-
|style="text-align:left;"|Nikola Vujnović||2020||2||0||0||2||0
|-
|style="text-align:left;"|Stefan Lončar||2018||2||0||0||2||0
|-
|style="text-align:left;"|Asmir Kajević||2018||2||0||0||2||0
|-
|style="text-align:left;"|Ivan Delić||2007–2010||2||0||0||2||0
|-
|style="text-align:left;"|Darko Božović||2007||2||0||0||2||0
|-
|style="text-align:left;"|Srđan Blažić||2009–2010||2||0||0||2||0
|-
|style="text-align:left;"|Blažo Igumanović||2012–2014||2||0||1||1||0
|-
|style="text-align:left;"|Janko Simović||2008||1||0||0||1||0
|-
|style="text-align:left;"|Goran Vujović||2009||1||0||1||0||0
|-
|style="text-align:left;"|Ivan Ivanović||2013||1||0||0||1||0
|-
|style="text-align:left;"|Nikola Nikezić||2007||1||0||0||1||0
|-
|style="text-align:left;"|Dragan Bošković||2012||1||0||0||1||0
|-
|style="text-align:left;"|Ivan Janjušević||2008||1||0||0||1||0
|-
|style="text-align:left;"|Slobodan Lakićević||2010||1||0||0||1||0
|-
|style="text-align:left;"|Ivan Vuković||2009||1||0||0||1||0
|-
|style="text-align:left;"|Vladimir Gluščević||2009||1||0||0||1||0
|-
|style="text-align:left;"|Rade Petrović||2007||1||0||0||1||0
|-
|style="text-align:left;"|Nikola Vukčević||2009||1||0||0||1||0
|-
|style="text-align:left;"|Neđeljko Vlahović||2007||1||0||0||1||0
|-
|style="text-align:left;"|Miloš Bakrač||2018||1||0||0||1||0
|-
|style="text-align:left;"|Nemanja Sekulić||2019||1||0||1||0||0
|-
|style="text-align:left;"|Vladan Adžić||2020||1||0||0||1||0
|-
|style="text-align:left;"|Matija Sarkic||2019||1||0||0||1||0
|-
|style="text-align:left;"|Vasko Kalezić||2020||1||0||0||1||0
|-
|style="text-align:left;"|Šaleta Kordić||2020||1||0||0||1||0
|-
|style="text-align:left;"|Miloš Milović||2020||1||0||0||1||0
|-
|style="text-align:left;"|Anđelko Jovanović||2020||1||0||0||1||0
|-
|style="text-align:left;"|Milutin Osmajić||2020||1||0||0||1||0
|}

Updated: 1 November 2020

List of goalscorers
The following table summarizes goals for the Montenegro national team by every single goalscorer. 

Updated: 31 March 2021

Captains

Managers

Team records

Largest home victory  5–0 , 8 October 2016, Podgorica
Largest away victory  0–6 , 11 September 2012, Serravalle
Largest home defeat  0–4 , 28 March 2013, Podgorica;  1–5 , 25 March 2019, Podgorica
Largest away defeat  7–0 , 14 November 2019, London
Longest winning streak 4 matches (11 August 2010 – 12 October 2010; 11 September 2012 – 26 March 2013)
Longest streak without defeat 8 matches (11 August 2010 – 10 August 2011)
Longest losing streak 4 matches (9 October 2015 – 29 March 2016)
Longest streak without win 7 matches (9 October 2015 – 8 October 2016; 5 October 2017 – 10 September 2018)
Highest home attendance 13,000,  1–1 , 26 March 2013, Podgorica
Highest away attendance 83,807''',  4–1 , 11 October 2013, London

Competition records
Montenegro have participated in seven qualification rounds for World Cup or European Championship tournaments. Montenegro have never qualified, and their biggest success was reaching the play-offs for Euro 2012.
Montenegro first tried to qualify for the 2010 World Cup in South Africa, but they finished fifth in their group. They had more success in the Euro 2012 qualifiers, when they finished second in their group to reach the play-offs, but lost to the Czech Republic.
In the qualifiers for the 2014 World Cup, Montenegro finished third, and two years later, in the qualifiers for Euro 2016, they finished fourth in their group. They again finished third in their 2018 World Cup qualifying group. Worst performance came in the qualifiers for Euro 2020, as Montenegro finished last-placed in the group without single victory.Updated: 28 March 2022FIFA World Cup

UEFA European Championship

UEFA Nations League

FIFA rankings history
The Montenegro national football team has been present on FIFA rankings since June 2007. To date, the team's best ranking was 16th place in the world in June 2011.
Below is a chronological list of Montenegro's position on the FIFA rankings for every three months, and their number of points.

Attendances records 
Home attendance by years
Since establishing, Montenegrin national team played all home games at Podgorica City Stadium.
Below is a list of attendances on Montenegro home games by every single year.G = Number of home games (only matches with spectators counted); H = Highest attendance on one match; L = Lowest attendance on one match''

Home attendance by competitions
Below is a list of attendances on Montenegro home games by every single competition. Friendly games are not counted.

See also
Montenegro national football team
Montenegro national football team results
Sport in Montenegro

References

External links
Football Association of Montenegro
Montenegro national football team results
Montenegro national football team results

Montenegro
Montenegro national football team
2007–08 in Montenegrin football
2008–09 in Montenegrin football
2009–10 in Montenegrin football
2010–11 in Montenegrin football
2011–12 in Montenegrin football
2012–13 in Montenegrin football
2013–14 in Montenegrin football